Chris Gudzowsky (born 15 August 1990) is a Canadian born bobsledder who started competing in 2006. He was a Canadian Pilot in both two-man and four-man bobsleigh, before switching to Crew and Brakes for Australia. He became the youngest driver in the sport to compete in a World Cup event during his 2010 Whistler World Cup debut at the Whistler Sliding Centre .

Biography
Gudzowsky was born in Calgary, Alberta, attending Elboya Elementary and Junior High School. He then proceeded to graduate with honors from Henry Wise Wood High School, before going on to work towards a Double Major in Marketing and International Business at Mount Royal University.

Sports career
Originally a Muay Thai fighter and Hockey player, in 2006 he switched to bobsleigh out of pure interest from his fathers past participation in the sport. At 16, he was the youngest bobsleigh athlete in the country. He then went on to compete on the Alberta Team for the next 3 years, until moving up to compete for Canada. He has competed in various international competitions over the years, as well as fore-running the Vancouver 2010 Winter Olympics in both two-man and four-man bobsleigh. In mid 2015 Gudzowsky moved to Australia. He took part and tested at the 2015 Australian National Team testing combine in Sydney Australia; making the Australian National Team in the process. He went on to compete for Australia's National Team in numerous international competitions. In 2017, he represented Australia's National Team at the PyeongChang Winter Olympic Test Event, In Korea, finishing 24th. Gudzowsky missed the opportunity of joining his team and representing Australia at the 2018 Olympic Winter Games in PyeongChang, due to citizenship processing issues. In 2020, Chris ended up receiving his Australian Citizenship; allowing him to represent Australia at future Olympic Games.

Personal life
Gudzowsky resides in Perth, WA, Australia. He continues to train full-time with hopes of competing in future Olympic Games and World Cup events.

Australian results

Canadian results

World Cup

North Americas Cup

References

Canadian male bobsledders
Sportspeople from Calgary
1990 births
Living people